1960 college football season may refer to:

 1960 NCAA University Division football season
 1960 NCAA College Division football season
 1960 NAIA football season